Dmitry Alexandrovich Geller (born 12 October 1970) is a Russian animator and film director.

Biography
Geller began his creative activity as an independent artist, participating in art exhibitions in St. Petersburg, Copenhagen, Washington and Sofia. In his native city Yekaterinburg he participated in exhibitions in several civic centres. In 1985, together with a group of architects, he participated in creation of happenings at disco parties in a civic centre.

In 1990s he began working as an artist at the studio "A-Film" at the Sverdlovsk Film Studio. He studied at the High Courses for Scriptwriters and Film Directors in Moscow (workshop of Fyodor Khitruk, Yuriy Norshteyn, Eduard Nazarov, and Andrei Khrzhanovsky), and graduated in the year 1997. In the same year, he made a one-minute film for the animation project Optimus Mundus.

Geller directed and animated sequences in feature and documentary films. He created graphic design for a series of documentaries about the small nations in Africa, Asia and the north of Russia, as well as opening night posters for movies.

Invited by Jilin Animation Institute in 2011–2020 he created together with students four animated films, one of which received the Chinese National Award for the best short film in 2012, and the Grand Prix of the Hiroshima Film Festival. 

Films of Geller have participated in musical performances in France and the Netherlands as his film Filmworks XIX: The Rain Horse ("Boy") was shown in the jubilee presentations celebrating the 60th anniversary of John Zorn in Paris and on his jubilee concert in Mexico City.

Retrospectives of  Geller’s films have taken part at film festivals in Moscow, St. Petersburg, Yekaterinburg, ANIMATOR (festival), Nikozi, Kraków, and Sofia, and selected films were shown in Amsterdam on the ship Azart ("The ship of fools"). Geller's films are shown in the collections of the Hiroshima Film Festival museum, Victoria and Albert Museum in London, and Cinematheque in New York.

Filmography
 The Mistress of the Copper Mountain, 2020
 Fishes swimmers boats, 2017
 Man meets woman, 2014
 The little pond by the great wall, 2012
 I saw mice burying a cat, 2011
 The sparrow who kept his word, 2010
 Boy. The Rain Horse, 2008
 Declaration of love, 2006
 Handicraft, 2004
 The little night symphony, 2003
 Hello from Kislovodsk, 2001
 Mystery - it’s you, 1998

Awards

Man meets woman
Grand Prix. Best animation film. Festival "Window to Europe" Vyborg, 2014
The Best Film for Adults "Tindirindis" Vilnius, Lithuania, 2014
Prize of the Guild of Film Critics and Cinema Journalists Russia. "Suzdal", 2014
2nd place in professional rating. Open Russian Festival of Animated Film, 2014
Best art director (Anna Karpova). National Animation Award "Ikar", 2015
Best composer (Artem Fadeev). National Animation Award "Ikar", 2015
Best sound director (Artem Fadeev). National Animation Award "Ikar", 2015
Best producer (Lyubov Gaidukova). National Animation Award "Ikar", 2015
"Special mention jury" WFAF. Varna, Bulgaria, 2014
Prize "the Best director". Tofuzi. Batumi, Georgia, 2014
"Special mention jury". Festival "Insomnia", 2014

I saw mice burying a cat
Grand Prix. Hiroshima International Animation Festival 2012
Best Short Film in 2011. National Award of China Association of animators "Golden monkey" China, 2012
Special Jury prize. Open Russian Festival of Animated Film, 2012
Special Jury prize. Festival "Window to Europe" Vyborg, 2012

The sparrow who kept his word
Best film for children. Open Russian Festival of Animated Film, 2011
First Prize. Festival "Orlenok". Russia, 2011
Best animation film for children. Festival "Golden Fish". Russia, 2011
Best animation film. Festival "Radiant Angel". Russia, 2011
Best animation film. Festival "Siyazhar". Russia, 2011
2nd place. Professional Jury award. Anima Mundi (event) 2011
3rd place. Children Jury award. Festival "Radiant Angel". Russia, 2011
Diploma. For the good clever fairy tale for children and not only. Festival "Film - children". Russia, 2011

Boy. The Rain Horse
Grand Prix. Best animation film. Festival "Kinofest" Romania, 2008
Grand Prix. Best animation film. Festival "Window to Europe" Vyborg, 2008
Prize of the Guild of Film Critics and Cinema Journalists Russia "White elephant" in the nomination "The best animated film of the year.", 2008
Diplome of Guild of film critics. Festival "Window to Europe" Vyborg, 2008
Prize "Bright Impression". Festival "Golden fish" Russia, 2008
2nd place. A professional rating. Open Russian Festival of Animated Film, 2008

Declaration of love
Prize of Guild of film critics. Festival "Suzdal". Russia, 2006 
2nd place. A professional rating. Open Russian Festival of Animated Film 2006
2nd place. Festival "Multivision". St. Petersburg, Russia, 2006
Special prize. KROK International Animated Films Festival. Ukraine, 2007

The little night symphony
Grand Prix. KROK International Animated Films Festival 2004
prize Grand. Open Russian Festival of Animated Film 2004
Prize of alliance of designers. "Window to Europe" Vyborg, Russia, 2004
Prize "Best experimental film".  "Animayevka". Belarus, 2004
Prize "Best sound". Fantoche, 2005
Prize. Festival "Gato de luna". Espana, 2007

Hello from Kislovodsk
Grand Prix. Open Russian Festival of Animated Film 2001
Grand Prix. KROK International Animated Films Festival 2001
Grand Prix. Festival. "Cinanima". Portugal, 2001
Prize for best debut. Annecy International Animated Film Festival 2001
Prize for best debut. Seoul International Cartoon and Animation Festival 2001
Special prize. Festival Stuttgart, Germany, 2002
Prize "Saint Anna Second Class". Festival of student films. Russia, 2001
Prize of magazine Premier. "Window to Europe" Vyborg, 2001

Mystery - it’s you
Prize of the festival of "Extra short film festival". Novosibirsk, Russia

External links
Geller website
 (incomplete filmography)
Dmitry Geller at animator.ru

References

1970 births
Living people
Russian animators
Russian film directors
Russian animated film directors